New South Wales is a state in Australia of great biodiversity, with 622 species of bird recorded.

This list is based on the 1996 classification by Sibley and Monroe (though there has been a recent (2008) extensive revision of Australian birds by Christidis and Boles), which has resulted in some lumping and splitting. Their system has been developed over nearly two decades and has strong local support, but deviates in important ways from more generally accepted schemes. Supplemental updates follow The Clements Checklist of Birds of the World, 2022 edition.

The following tags have been used to highlight several categories. The commonly occurring native species do not fall into any of these categories.

 (A) Accidental - a species that rarely or accidentally occurs in New South Wales
 (E) Endemic - a species endemic to New South Wales
 (I) Introduced - a species introduced to New South Wales as a consequence, direct or indirect, of human actions

Ostriches
Order: StruthioniformesFamily: Struthionidae

This order is not native to Australia, but feral populations of one species have become established.

 Common ostrich, Struthio camelus (I)

Cassowaries and emu
Order: CasuariiformesFamily: Casuariidae

This family of flightless ratite birds is represented by two living species in Australia. Another two species are found in New Guinea. The extinct, geographically-isolated King and Kangaroo Island emus were historically considered to be separate species to mainland emus. However, genetic evidence from 2011 suggests that all three are conspecific.

Emu, Dromaius novaehollandiae

Magpie goose
Order: AnseriformesFamily: Anseranatidae

The family contains a single species, the magpie goose. It was an early and distinctive offshoot of the anseriform family tree, diverging after the screamers and before all other ducks, geese and swans, sometime in the late Cretaceous. The single species is found across Australia.

Magpie goose, Anseranas semipalmata

Ducks, geese, and waterfowl

Order: AnseriformesFamily: Anatidae

The family Anatidae includes the ducks and most duck-like waterfowl, such as geese and swans. These are adapted for an aquatic existence, with webbed feet, bills that are flattened to a greater or lesser extent, and feathers that are excellent at shedding water due to special oils.

 
Plumed whistling-duck, Dendrocygna eytoni 
Wandering whistling-duck, Dendrocygna arcuata
Canada goose, Branta canadensis  (A)
Cape Barren goose, Cereopsis novaehollandiae  (A)
Freckled duck, Stictonetta naevosa 
Mute swan, Cygnus olor (I)
Black swan, Cygnus atratus
Radjah shelduck, Radjah radjah (A)
Australian shelduck, Tadorna tadornoides 
Paradise shelduck, Tadorna variegata (A)
Green pygmy-goose, Nettapus pulchellus (A)
Cotton pygmy-goose, Nettapus coromandelianus (A)
Australian wood duck, Chenonetta jubata 
Garganey, Spatula querquedula (A)
Australian shoveler, Spatula rhynchotis
Northern shoveler, Spatula clypeata (A)
Pacific black duck, Anas superciliosa
Mallard, Anas platyrhynchos (I)
Northern pintail, Anas acuta (A)
Gray teal, Anas gracilis
Chestnut teal, Anas castanea 
Pink-eared duck, Malacorhynchus membranaceus 
Hardhead, Aythya australis 
Blue-billed duck, Oxyura australis (A)
Musk duck, Biziura lobata

Megapodes
Order: GalliformesFamily: Megapodiidae

Megapodiidae are represented by various species in the Australasian region. They are commonly referred to as "mound-builders" due to their habit of constructing large mounds to incubate their eggs.

Australian brushturkey, Alectura lathami
Malleefowl, 	Leipoa ocellata

Guineafowl
Order: GalliformesFamily: Numididae

Numididae are not native to Australia, but feral populations of one species exist in New South Wales.

Helmeted guineafowl, Numida meleagris (I)

New World quail
Order: GalliformesFamily: Odontophoridae

The New World quails are small, plump terrestrial birds only distantly related to the quails of the Old World, but named for their similar appearance and habits.

California quail Callipepla californica (I)

Pheasants, grouse, and allies
Order: GalliformesFamily: Phasianidae

Phasianidae consists of the pheasants and their allies. These are terrestrial species, variable in size but generally plump, with broad, relatively short wings. Many species are gamebirds or have been domesticated as a food source for humans.

Indian peafowl, Pavo cristatus (I)
Red junglefowl, Gallus gallus (I)
Brown quail, Synoicus ypsilophora
Blue-breasted quail, Synoicus chinensis
Stubble quail, Coturnix pectoralis

Grebes
Order: PodicipediformesFamily: Podicipedidae

Grebes are small to medium-large freshwater diving birds. They have lobed toes and are excellent swimmers and divers. However, they have their feet placed far back on the body, making them quite ungainly on land.

Australasian grebe, Tachybaptus novaehollandiae
Hoary-headed grebe, Poliocephalus poliocephalus
Great crested grebe, Podiceps cristatus

Pigeons and doves
Order: ColumbiformesFamily: Columbidae

Pigeons and doves are stout-bodied birds with short necks and short slender bills with a fleshy cere.

Rock pigeon, Columba livia (I) 
White-headed pigeon, Columba leucomela
Spotted dove, Streptopelia chinensis (I)
Laughing dove, Streptopelia senegalensis (I)
Brown cuckoo-dove, Macropygia phasianella 
Pacific emerald dove, Chalcophaps longirostris
Common bronzewing, Phaps chalcoptera 
Brush bronzewing, Phaps elegans 
Flock bronzewing, Phaps histrionica 
Crested pigeon, Ocyphaps lophotes 
Squatter pigeon, Geophaps scripta 
Wonga pigeon, Leucosarcia melanoleuca 
Diamond dove, Geopelia cuneata 
Peaceful dove, Geopelia placida
Bar-shouldered dove, Geopelia humeralis
Wompoo fruit-dove, Ptilinopus magnificus
Superb fruit-dove, Ptilinopus superbus
Rose-crowned fruit-dove, Ptilinopus regina
Torresian imperial-pigeon, Ducula spilorrhoa
Topknot pigeon, Lopholaimus antarcticus

Bustards
Order: OtidiformesFamily: Otididae

Bustards are large terrestrial birds mainly associated with dry open country and steppes in the Old World. They are omnivorous and nest on the ground. They walk steadily on strong legs and big toes, pecking for food as they go. They have long broad wings with "fingered" wingtips and striking patterns in flight. Many have interesting mating displays.

Australian bustard, Ardeotis australis

Cuckoos
Order: CuculiformesFamily: Cuculidae

The family Cuculidae includes cuckoos, roadrunners and anis. These birds are of variable size with slender bodies, long tails and strong legs. The Old World cuckoos are brood parasites.

Pheasant coucal, Centropus phasianinus
Pacific koel, Eudynamys orientalis
Long-tailed koel, Urodynamis taitensis (A)
Channel-billed cuckoo, Scythrops novaehollandiae
Horsfield's bronze-cuckoo, Chrysococcyx basalis
Black-eared cuckoo, Chrysococcyx osculans 
Shining bronze-cuckoo, Chrysococcyx lucidus
Little bronze-cuckoo, Chrysococcyx minutillus
Pallid cuckoo, Cuculus pallidus
Fan-tailed cuckoo, Cacomantis flabelliformis
Brush cuckoo, Cacomantis variolosus
Oriental cuckoo, Cuculus optatus (A)

Frogmouths
Order: CaprimulgiformesFamily: Podargidae

The frogmouths are a distinctive group of small nocturnal birds related to swifts found from India across southern Asia to Australia.

Tawny frogmouth, Podargus strigoides 
Marbled frogmouth, Podargus ocellatus

Nightjars and allies
Order: CaprimulgiformesFamily: Caprimulgidae

Nightjars are medium-sized nocturnal birds that usually nest on the ground. They have long wings, short legs and very short bills. Most have small feet, of little use for walking, and long pointed wings. Their soft plumage is camouflaged to resemble bark or leaves.

Spotted nightjar, Eurostopodus argus
White-throated nightjar, Eurostopodus mystacalis

Owlet-nightjars
Order: CaprimulgiformesFamily: Aegothelidae

The owlet-nightjars are a distinctive group of small nocturnal birds related to swifts found from the Maluku Islands and New Guinea to Australia and New Caledonia.

Australian owlet-nightjar, Aegotheles cristatus

Swifts
Order: CaprimulgiformesFamily: Apodidae

Swifts are small birds which spend the majority of their lives flying. These birds have very short legs and never settle voluntarily on the ground, perching instead only on vertical surfaces. Many swifts have long swept-back wings which resemble a crescent or boomerang.

White-throated needletail, Hirundapus caudacutus
Australian swiftlet, Aerodramus terraereginae (A)
Uniform swiftlet, Aerodramus vanikorensis (A)
Pacific swift, Apus pacificus

Rails, gallinules, and coots
Order: GruiformesFamily: Rallidae

Rallidae is a large family of small to medium-sized birds which includes the rails, crakes, coots and gallinules. Typically they inhabit dense vegetation in damp environments near lakes, swamps or rivers. In general they are shy and secretive birds, making them difficult to observe. Most species have strong legs and long toes which are well adapted to soft uneven surfaces. They tend to have short, rounded wings and to be weak fliers.

Corn crake, Crex crex (A)
Lewin's rail, Lewinia pectoralis
Lord Howe rail, Gallirallus sylvestris Outlying islands only
Buff-banded rail, Gallirallus philippensis
Black-tailed nativehen, Tribonyx ventralis
Australian crake, Porzana fluminea 
Dusky moorhen, Gallinula tenebrosa
Eurasian coot, Fulica atra
Australasian swamphen, Porphyrio melanotus
Lord Howe swamphen, Porphyrio albus Outlying islands only Extinct
White-browed crake, Poliolimnas cinereus
Pale-vented bush-hen, Amaurornis moluccana
Baillon's crake, Zapornia pusilla
Spotless crake, Zapornia tabuensis

Cranes
Order: GruiformesFamily: Gruidae

Cranes are large, long-legged and long-necked birds. Unlike the similar-looking but unrelated herons, cranes fly with necks outstretched, not pulled back. Most have elaborate and noisy courting displays or "dances".

Brolga, Antigone rubicunda

Thick-knees
Order: CharadriiformesFamily: Burhinidae

The thick-knees are a group of largely tropical waders in the family Burhinidae. They are found worldwide within the tropical zone, with some species also breeding in temperate Europe and Australia. They are medium to large waders with strong black or yellow-black bills, large yellow eyes and cryptic plumage. Despite being classed as waders, most species have a preference for arid or semi-arid habitats.

Bush thick-knee, Burhinus grallarius 
Beach thick-knee, Esacus magnirostris

Stilts and avocets
Order: CharadriiformesFamily: Recurvirostridae

Recurvirostridae is a family of large wading birds, which includes the avocets and stilts. The avocets have long legs and long up-curved bills. The stilts have extremely long legs and long, thin straight bills.

Pied stilt, Himantopus leucocephalus
Banded stilt, Cladorhynchus leucocephalus (A)
Red-necked avocet, Recurvirostra novaehollandiae

Oystercatchers
Order: CharadriiformesFamily: Haematopodidae

The oystercatchers are large and noisy plover-like birds, with strong bills used for smashing or prising open molluscs.

Pied oystercatcher, Haematopus longirostris
South Island oystercatcher, Haematopus finschi (A)
Sooty oystercatcher, Haematopus fuliginosus

Plovers and lapwings
Order: CharadriiformesFamily: Charadriidae

The family Charadriidae includes the plovers, dotterels and lapwings. They are small to medium-sized birds with compact bodies, short, thick necks and long, usually pointed, wings. They are found in open country worldwide, mostly in habitats near water.

Black-bellied plover, Pluvialis squatarola
American golden-plover, Pluvialis dominica (A)
Pacific golden-plover, Pluvialis fulva
Gray-headed lapwing, Vanellus cinereus (A)
Banded lapwing, Vanellus tricolor 
Masked lapwing, Vanellus miles
Lesser sand-plover, Charadrius mongolus
Greater sand-plover, Charadrius leschenaultii
Double-banded plover, Charadrius bicinctus
Red-capped plover, Charadrius ruficapillus
Kentish plover, Charadrius alexandrinus (A)
Common ringed plover, Charadrius hiaticula (A)
Semipalmated plover, Charadrius semipalmatus (A)
Oriental plover, Charadrius veredus
Red-kneed dotterel, Erythrogonys cinctus 
Hooded plover, Thinornis cucullatus 
Black-fronted dotterel, Elseyornis melanops
Inland dotterel, Peltohyas australis

Plains-wanderer
Order: CharadriiformesFamily: Pedionomidae

The plains-wanderer is a quail-like ground bird. They are excellent camouflagers, and will first hide at any disturbance. If they're approached too close, they will run as opposed to flying, which they are very poor at.

Plains-wanderer, Pedionomus torquatus

Painted-snipes
Order: CharadriiformesFamily: Rostratulidae

Painted-snipes are short-legged, long-billed birds similar in shape to the true snipes, but more brightly coloured.

Australian painted-snipe, Rostratula australis

Jacanas
Order: CharadriiformesFamily: Jacanidae

The jacanas are a group of waders found throughout the tropics. They are identifiable by their huge feet and claws which enable them to walk on floating vegetation in the shallow lakes that are their preferred habitat.

Comb-crested jacana, Irediparra gallinacea

Sandpipers and allies
Order: CharadriiformesFamily: Scolopacidae

Scolopacidae is a large diverse family of small to medium-sized shorebirds including the sandpipers, curlews, godwits, shanks, tattlers, woodcocks, snipes, dowitchers, and phalaropes. The majority of these species eat small invertebrates picked out of the mud or soil. Variation in length of legs and bills enables multiple species to feed in the same habitat, particularly on the coast, without direct competition for food.

Upland sandpiper, Bartramia longicauda (A)
Whimbrel, Numenius phaeopus
Little curlew, Numenius minutus (A)
Far Eastern curlew, Numenius madagascariensis
Bar-tailed godwit, Limosa lapponica
Black-tailed godwit, Limosa limosa
Hudsonian godwit, Limosa haemastica (A)
Ruddy turnstone, Arenaria interpres
Great knot, Calidris tenuirostris
Red knot, Calidris canutus
Ruff, Calidris pugnax
Broad-billed sandpiper, Calidris falcinellus
Sharp-tailed sandpiper, Calidris acuminata
Curlew sandpiper, Calidris ferruginea
Long-toed stint, Calidris subminuta
Red-necked stint, Calidris ruficollis
Sanderling, Calidris alba
Dunlin, Calidris alpina (A)
Little stint, Calidris minuta (A)
White-rumped sandpiper, Calidris fuscicollis (A)
Buff-breasted sandpiper, Calidris subruficollis (A)
Pectoral sandpiper, Calidris melanotos (A)
Asian dowitcher, Limnodromus semipalmatus
Latham's snipe, Gallinago hardwickii
Pin-tailed snipe, Gallinago stenura (A)
Terek sandpiper, Xenus cinereus
Red-necked phalarope, Phalaropus lobatus
Common sandpiper, Actitis hypoleucos
Gray-tailed tattler, Tringa brevipes
Wandering tattler, Tringa incana
Spotted redshank, Tringa erythropus (A)
Common greenshank, Tringa nebularia
Lesser yellowlegs, Tringa flavipes (A)
Marsh sandpiper, Tringa stagnatilis
Wood sandpiper, Tringa glareola
Common redshank, Tringa totanus (A)

Buttonquail
Order: CharadriiformesFamily: Turnicidae

The buttonquails are small, drab, running birds which resemble the true quails. The female is the brighter of the sexes and initiates courtship. The male incubates the eggs and tends the young.

Red-backed buttonquail, Turnix maculosus
Black-breasted buttonquail, Turnix melanogaster 
Buff-breasted buttonquail, Turnix olivii 
Painted buttonquail, Turnix varius
Red-chested buttonquail, Turnix pyrrhothorax 
Little buttonquail, Turnix velox

Pratincoles and coursers
Order: CharadriiformesFamily: Glareolidae

Glareolidae is a family of wading birds comprising the pratincoles, which have short legs, long pointed wings, and long forked tails, and the coursers, which have long legs, short wings, and long, pointed bills which curve downwards.

Australian pratincole, Stiltia isabella
Oriental pratincole, Glareola maldivarum (A)

Skuas and jaegers
Order: CharadriiformesFamily: Stercorariidae

The family Stercorariidae are, in general, medium to large birds, typically with grey or brown plumage, often with white markings on the wings. They nest on the ground in temperate and arctic regions and are long-distance migrants.

South polar skua, Stercorarius maccormicki (A)
Brown skua, Stercorarius antarcticus
Pomarine jaeger, Stercorarius pomarinus
Parasitic jaeger, Stercorarius parasiticus
Long-tailed jaeger, Stercorarius longicaudus (A)

Gulls, terns, and skimmers
Order: CharadriiformesFamily: Laridae

Laridae is a family of medium to large seabirds, the gulls, terns, and skimmers. Gulls are typically grey or white, often with black markings on the head or wings. They have stout, longish bills and webbed feet. Terns are a group of generally medium to large seabirds typically with grey or white plumage, often with black markings on the head. Most terns hunt fish by diving but some pick insects off the surface of fresh water. Terns are generally long-lived birds, with several species known to live in excess of 30 years. Skimmers are a small family of tropical tern-like birds. They have an elongated lower mandible which they use to feed by flying low over the water surface and skimming the water for small fish.

Sabine's gull, Xema sabini (A)
Silver gull, Chroicocephalus novaehollandiae
Black-headed gull, Chroicocephalus ridibundus (A)
Laughing gull, Leucophaeus atricilla (A)
Franklin's gull, Leucophaeus pipixcan (A)
Pacific gull, Larus pacificus 
Lesser black-backed gull, Larus fuscus (A)
Kelp gull, Larus dominicanus 
Brown noddy, Anous stolidus
Black noddy, Anous minutus (A)
Gray noddy, Anous albivitta (A)
White tern, Gygis alba
Sooty tern, Onychoprion fuscatus
Bridled tern, Onychoprion anaethetus (A)
Aleutian tern, Onychoprion aleuticus (A)
Little tern, Sternula albifrons
Australian fairy tern, Sternula nereis (A)
Gull-billed tern, Gelochelidon nilotica
Caspian tern, Hydroprogne caspia
Black tern, Chlidonias niger (A)
White-winged tern, Chlidonias leucopterus
Whiskered tern, Chlidonias hybrida
Black-fronted tern, Chlidonias albostriatus (A)
Roseate tern, Sterna dougallii (A)
White-fronted tern, Sterna striata
Black-naped tern, Sterna sumatrana
Common tern, Sterna hirundo
Arctic tern, Sterna paradisaea (A)
Great crested tern, Thalasseus bergii
Lesser crested tern, Thalasseus bengalensis (A)

Tropicbirds
Order: PhaethontiformesFamily: Phaethontidae

Tropicbirds are slender white birds of tropical oceans, with exceptionally long central tail feathers. Their long wings have black markings, as does the head.

White-tailed tropicbird, Phaethon lepturus (A)
Red-billed tropicbird, Phaethon aethereus (A)
Red-tailed tropicbird, Phaethon rubricauda (A)

Penguins
Order: SphenisciformesFamily: Spheniscidae

Penguins are a group of aquatic, flightless birds living almost exclusively in the Southern Hemisphere, especially in Antarctica. Only one species, the little penguin, breeds on the Australian coast.

Little penguin, Eudyptula minor
Fiordland penguin, Eudyptula pachyrhynchus (A)
Macaroni penguin, Eudyptula chrysolophus (A)
Southern rockhopper penguin, Eudyptula chrysocome (A)

Albatrosses
Order: ProcellariiformesFamily: Diomedeidae

The albatrosses are a family of large seabird found across the Southern and North Pacific Oceans. The largest are among the largest flying birds in the world.

Yellow-nosed albatross, Thalassarche chlororhynchos
Gray-headed albatross, Thalassarche chrysostoma (A)
Buller's albatross, Thalassarche bulleri 
White-capped albatross, Thalassarche cauta
Salvin's albatross, Thalassarche salvini (A)
Chatham albatross, Thalassarche eremita (A)
Black-browed albatross, Thalassarche melanophris
Sooty albatross, Phoebetria fusca (A)
Light-mantled albatross, Phoebetria palpebrata (A)
Royal albatross, Diomedea epomophora (A)
Wandering albatross, Diomedea exulans

Southern storm-petrels
Order: ProcellariiformesFamily: Oceanitidae

The southern storm-petrels are the smallest seabirds, relatives of the petrels, feeding on planktonic crustaceans and small fish picked from the surface, typically while hovering. Their flight is fluttering and sometimes bat-like.

Wilson's storm-petrel, Oceanites oceanicus
Gray-backed storm-petrel, Garrodia nereis (A)
White-faced storm-petrel, Pelagodroma marina
White-bellied storm-petrel, Fregetta grallaria (A)
New Zealand storm-petrel, Fregetta maoriana (A)
Black-bellied storm-petrel, Fregetta tropica (A)

Northern storm-petrels
Order: ProcellariiformesFamily: Hydrobatidae

Though the members of this family are similar in many respects to the southern storm-petrels, including their general appearance and habits, there are enough genetic differences to warrant their placement in a separate family.

Band-rumped storm-petrel, Hydrobates castro (A)
Tristram's storm-petrel, Hydrobates tristrami (A)

Shearwaters and petrels
Order: ProcellariiformesFamily: Procellariidae

The procellariids are the main group of medium-sized "true petrels", characterised by united nostrils with medium nasal septum, and a long outer functional primary flight feather.

Southern giant-petrel, Macronectes giganteus 
Northern giant-petrel, Macronectes halli (A)
Southern fulmar, Fulmarus glacialoides (A)
Antarctic petrel, Thalassoica antarctica (A)
Cape petrel, Daption capense
Kerguelen petrel, Aphrodroma brevirostris (A)
Great-winged petrel, Pterodroma macroptera
Gray-faced petrel, Pterodroma gouldi 
Kermadec petrel, Pterodroma neglecta (A)
Herald petrel, Pterodroma heraldica (A)
Providence petrel, Pterodroma solandri 
Soft-plumaged petrel, Pterodroma mollis 
Barau's petrel, Pterodroma baraui (A)
White-headed petrel, Pterodroma lessonii 
Mottled petrel, Pterodroma inexpectata (A)
Juan Fernandez petrel, Pterodroma externa (A) 
White-necked petrel, Pterodroma cervicalis
Black-winged petrel, Pterodroma nigripennis (A)
Cook's petrel, Pterodroma cookii (A) 
Gould's petrel, Pterodroma leucoptera 
Collared petrel, Pterodroma brevipes (A)
Vanuatu petrel, Pterodroma occulta (A)
Blue petrel, Halobaena caerulea (A)
Fairy prion, Pachyptila turtur
Broad-billed prion, Pachyptila vittata (A)
Salvin's prion, Pachyptila salvini
Antarctic prion, Pachyptila desolata 
Slender-billed prion, Pachyptila belcheri 
Fulmar prion, Pachyptila crassirostris (A)
Bulwer's petrel, Bulweria bulwerii (A)
Tahiti petrel, Pseudobulweria rostrata 
Gray petrel, Procellaria cinerea (A)
White-chinned petrel, Procellaria aequinoctialis (A)
Parkinson's petrel, Procellaria parkinsoni 
Westland petrel, Procellaria westlandica (A)
Streaked shearwater, Calonectris leucomelas
Cory's shearwater, Calonectris diomedea (A)
Pink-footed shearwater, Ardenna creatopus (A)
Flesh-footed shearwater, Ardenna carneipes
Great shearwater, Ardenna gravis (A)
Wedge-tailed shearwater, Ardenna pacifica
Buller's shearwater, Ardenna bulleri 
Sooty shearwater, Ardenna grisea
Short-tailed shearwater, Ardenna tenuirostris
Manx shearwater, Puffinus puffinus (A)
Hutton's shearwater, Puffinus huttoni
Newell's shearwater, Puffinus newelli (A)
Fluttering shearwater, Puffinus gavia
Little shearwater, Puffinus assimilis (A)
Tropical shearwater, Puffinus bailloni (A)
Common diving-petrel, Pelecanoides urinatrix 
South Georgia diving-petrel, Pelecanoides georgicus (A)

Storks
Order: CiconiiformesFamily: Ciconiidae

Storks are large, long-legged, long-necked, wading birds with long, stout bills. Storks are mute, but bill-clattering is an important mode of communication at the nest. Their nests can be large and may be reused for many years.

Black-necked stork, Ephippiorhynchus asiaticus

Frigatebirds
Order: SuliformesFamily: Fregatidae

Frigatebirds are large seabirds usually found over tropical oceans. They are large, black, or black-and-white, with long wings and deeply forked tails. The males have coloured inflatable throat pouches. They do not swim or walk and cannot take off from a flat surface. Having the largest wingspan-to-body-weight ratio of any bird, they are essentially aerial, able to stay aloft for more than a week.

Lesser frigatebird, Fregata ariel (A)
Great frigatebird, Fregata minor (A)

Boobies and gannets
Order: SuliformesFamily: Sulidae

The sulids comprise the gannets and boobies. Both groups are medium-large coastal seabirds that plunge-dive for fish.

Masked booby, Sula dactylatra (A)
Brown booby, Sula leucogaster
Red-footed booby, Sula sula (A)
Australasian gannet, Morus serrator

Anhingas
Order: SuliformesFamily: Anhingidae

Anhingas or darters are cormorant-like water birds with long necks and long, straight bills. They are fish eaters which often swim with only their neck above the water.

Australasian darter, Anhinga novaehollandiae

Cormorants and shags
Order: SuliformesFamily: Phalacrocoracidae

Cormorants are medium-to-large aquatic birds, usually with mainly dark plumage and areas of coloured skin on the face. The bill is long, thin and sharply hooked. Their feet are four-toed and webbed, a distinguishing feature among the order Pelecaniformes.

Little pied cormorant, Microcarbo melanoleucos
Great cormorant, Phalacrocorax carbo
Little black cormorant, Phalacrocorax sulcirostris
Pied cormorant, Phalacrocorax varius
Black-faced cormorant, Phalacrocorax fuscescens (A)

Pelicans
Order: PelecaniformesFamily: Pelecanidae

Pelicans are large water birds with distinctive pouches under their bills. Like other birds in the order Pelecaniformes, they have four webbed toes.

Australian pelican, Pelecanus conspicillatus

Herons, egrets, and bitterns 
Order: PelecaniformesFamily: Ardeidae

The family Ardeidae contains the bitterns, herons, and egrets. Herons and egrets are medium to large wading birds with long necks and legs. Bitterns tend to be shorter necked and more wary. Members of Ardeidae fly with their necks retracted, unlike other long-necked birds such as storks, ibises, and spoonbills.

Australasian bittern, Botaurus poiciloptilus
Black-backed bittern, Ixobrychus dubius
Black bittern, Ixobrychus flavicollis 
Gray heron, Ardea cinerea (A)
Pacific heron, Ardea pacifica
Great-billed heron, Ardea sumatrana (A)
Purple heron, Ardea purpurea (A)
Great egret, Ardea alba
Intermediate egret, Ardea intermedia
White-faced heron, Egretta novaehollandiae
Little egret, Egretta garzetta
Pacific reef-heron, Egretta sacra
Pied heron, Egretta picata (A)
Cattle egret, Bubulcus ibis
Striated heron, Butorides striata
Nankeen night-heron, Nycticorax caledonicus

Ibises and spoonbills
Order: PelecaniformesFamily: Threskiornithidae

Threskiornithidae is a family of large terrestrial and wading birds which includes the ibises and spoonbills. They have long, broad wings with 11 primary and about 20 secondary feathers. They are strong fliers and despite their size and weight, very capable soarers.

Glossy ibis, Plegadis falcinellus
Australian ibis, Threskiornis moluccus
Straw-necked ibis, Threskiornis spinicollis
Royal spoonbill, Platalea regia
Yellow-billed spoonbill, Platalea flavipes

Osprey
Order: AccipitriformesFamily: Pandionidae

The family Pandionidae contains only one species, the osprey. The osprey is a medium-large raptor which is a specialist fish-eater with a worldwide distribution.

Osprey, Pandion haliaetus

Hawks, eagles, and kites
Order: AccipitriformesFamily: Accipitridae

Accipitridae is a family of birds of prey, which includes hawks, eagles, kites, harriers and Old World vultures. These birds have powerful hooked beaks for tearing flesh from their prey, strong legs, powerful talons and keen eyesight.

Black-shouldered kite, Elanus axillaris 
Letter-winged kite, Elanus scriptus (A)
Black-breasted kite, Hamirostra melanosternon 
Square-tailed kite, Lophoictinia isura 
Pacific baza, Aviceda subcristata
Little eagle, Hieraaetus morphnoides
Wedge-tailed eagle, Aquila audax
Swamp harrier, Circus approximans
Spotted harrier, Circus assimilis
Gray goshawk, Accipiter novaehollandiae
Brown goshawk, Accipiter fasciatus
Collared sparrowhawk, Accipiter cirrocephalus
Red goshawk, Erythrotriorchis radiatus (A)
Black kite, Milvus migrans
Whistling kite, Haliastur sphenurus
Brahminy kite, Haliastur indus
White-bellied sea-eagle, Haliaeetus leucogaster

Barn-owls
Order: StrigiformesFamily: Tytonidae

Barn-owls are medium to large owls with large heads and characteristic heart-shaped faces. They have long strong legs with powerful talons.

Sooty owl, Tyto tenebricosa
Australian masked-owl, Tyto novaehollandiae
Australasian grass-owl, Tyto longimembris
Barn owl, Tyto alba

Owls
Order: StrigiformesFamily: Strigidae

The typical owls are small to large solitary nocturnal birds of prey. They have large forward-facing eyes and ears, a hawk-like beak, and a conspicuous circle of feathers around each eye called a facial disk.

Powerful owl, Ninox strenua 
Barking owl, Ninox connivens
Southern boobook, Ninox boobook
Morepork, Ninox novaeseelandiae

Kingfishers
Order: CoraciiformesFamily: Alcedinidae

Kingfishers are medium-sized birds with large heads, long pointed bills, short legs, and stubby tails.

Azure kingfisher, Ceyx azureus
Laughing kookaburra, Dacelo novaeguineae 
Blue-winged kookaburra, Dacelo leachii (A)
Red-backed kingfisher, Todiramphus pyrrhopygius 
Forest kingfisher, Todiramphus macleayii
Torresian kingfisher, Todiramphus sordidus
Sacred kingfisher, Todiramphus sanctus

Bee-eaters
Order: CoraciiformesFamily: Meropidae

The bee-eaters are a group of near passerine birds in the family Meropidae. Most species are found in Africa but others occur in southern Europe, Madagascar, Australia, and New Guinea. They are characterised by richly coloured plumage, slender bodies, and usually elongated central tail feathers. All are colourful and have long downturned bills and pointed wings, which give them a swallow-like appearance when seen from afar.

Rainbow bee-eater, Merops ornatus

Rollers
Order: CoraciiformesFamily: Coraciidae

Rollers resemble crows in size and build, but are more closely related to the kingfishers and bee-eaters. They share the colourful appearance of those groups with blues and browns predominating. The two inner front toes are connected, but the outer toe is not.

Dollarbird, Eurystomus orientalis

Falcons and caracaras
Order: FalconiformesFamily: Falconidae

Falconidae is a family of diurnal birds of prey. They differ from hawks, eagles, and kites in that they kill with their beaks instead of their talons.

Nankeen kestrel, Falco cenchroides
Australian hobby, Falco longipennis
Brown falcon, Falco berigora
Gray falcon, Falco hypoleucos 
Black falcon, Falco subniger 
Peregrine falcon, Falco peregrinus

Cockatoos
Order: PsittaciformesFamily:  Cacatuidae

The cockatoos share many features with other parrots including the characteristic curved beak shape and a zygodactyl foot, with two forward toes and two backwards toes. They differ, however in a number of characteristics, including the often spectacular movable headcrest.

Red-tailed black-cockatoo, Calyptorhynchus banksii 
Glossy black-cockatoo, Calyptorhynchus lathami 
Yellow-tailed black-cockatoo, Calyptorhynchus funereus 
Gang-gang cockatoo, Callocephalon fimbriatum 
Pink cockatoo, Lophochroa leadbeateri 
Galah, Eolophus roseicapilla
Long-billed corella, Cacatua tenuirostris
Little corella, Cacatua sanguinea
Sulphur-crested cockatoo, Cacatua galerita
Cockatiel, Nymphicus hollandicus

Old World parrots
Order: PsittaciformesFamily: Psittaculidae

Characteristic features of parrots include a strong curved bill, an upright stance, strong legs, and clawed zygodactyl feet. Many parrots are vividly coloured, and some are multi-coloured. Old World parrots are found from Africa east across south and southeast Asia and Oceania to Australia and New Zealand.

Superb parrot, Polytelis swainsonii 
Regent parrot, Polytelis anthopeplus 
Australian king-parrot, Alisterus scapularis 
Red-winged parrot, Aprosmictus erythropterus
Ground parrot, Pezoporus wallicus 
Night parrot, Pezoporus occidentalis 
Bourke's parrot, Neophema bourkii 
Blue-winged parrot, Neophema chrysostoma 
Elegant parrot, Neophema elegans (A)
Orange-bellied parrot, Neophema chrysogaster (A) 
Turquoise parrot, Neophema pulchella 
Scarlet-chested parrot, Neophema splendida (A)
Swift parrot, Lathamus discolor 
Australian ringneck, Barnardius barnardi
Crimson rosella, Platycercus elegans 
Eastern rosella, Platycercus eximius 
Pale-headed rosella, Platycercus adscitus
Greater bluebonnet, Northiella haematogaster
Red-rumped parrot, Psephotus haematonotus 
Mulga parrot, Psephotus varius
Paradise parrot, Psephotus pulcherrimus
Double-eyed fig-parrot, Cyclopsitta diophthalma
Budgerigar, Melopsittacus undulatus 
Little lorikeet, Parvipsitta pusilla 
Purple-crowned lorikeet, Parvipsitta porphyrocephala 
Musk lorikeet, Glossopsitta concinna 
Scaly-breasted lorikeet, Trichoglossus chlorolepidotus
Rainbow lorikeet, Trichoglossus moluccanus
Red-collared lorikeet, Trichoglossus rubritorquis

Pittas
Order: PasseriformesFamily: Pittidae

Pittas are medium-sized by passerine standards and are stocky, with fairly long, strong legs, short tails, and stout bills. Many are brightly coloured. They spend the majority of their time on wet forest floors, eating snails, insects, and similar invertebrates.

Noisy pitta, Pitta versicolor

Lyrebirds
Order: PasseriformesFamily: Menuridae

Lyrebirds are most notable for their superb ability to mimic natural and artificial sounds from their environment, and the striking beauty of the male bird's huge tail when it is fanned out in courtship display.

Albert's lyrebird, Menura alberti 
Superb lyrebird, Menura novaehollandiae

Scrub-birds
Order: PasseriformesFamily: Atrichornithidae

The scrub-bird family is ancient and is understood to be most closely related to the lyrebirds, and probably also the bowerbirds and treecreepers.

Rufous scrub-bird, Atrichornis rufescens

Bowerbirds
Order: PasseriformesFamily: Ptilonorhynchidae

The bowerbirds are small to medium-sized passerine birds. The males notably build a bower to attract a mate. Depending on the species, the bower ranges from a circle of cleared earth with a small pile of twigs in the center to a complex and highly decorated structure of sticks and leaves.

Green catbird, Ailuroedus crassirostris 
Regent bowerbird, Sericulus chrysocephalus 
Satin bowerbird, Ptilonorhynchus violaceus 
Spotted bowerbird, Chlamydera maculata

Australasian treecreepers
Order: PasseriformesFamily: Climacteridae

The Climacteridae are medium-small, mostly brown-coloured birds with patterning on their underparts.

White-throated treecreeper, Cormobates leucophaea 
White-browed treecreeper, Climacteris affinis 
Red-browed treecreeper, Climacteris erythrops 
Brown treecreeper, Climacteris picumnus

Fairywrens
Order: PasseriformesFamily: Maluridae

Maluridae is a family of small, insectivorous passerine birds endemic to Australia and New Guinea. They are socially monogamous and sexually promiscuous, meaning that although they form pairs between one male and one female, each partner will mate with other individuals and even assist in raising the young from such pairings.

Gray grasswren, Amytornis barbatus
Striated grasswren, Amytornis striatus 
Short-tailed grasswren, Amytornis merrotsyi
Thick-billed grasswren, Amytornis modestus
Eyrean grasswren, Amytornis goyderi 
Southern emuwren, Stipiturus malachurus 
Malle emuwren, Stipiturus mallee (A)
Purple-backed fairywren, Malurus assimilis 
Variegated fairywren, Malurus lamberti 
Splendid fairywren, Malurus splendens
Superb fairywren, Malurus cyaneus 
White-winged fairywren, Malurus leucopterus 
Red-backed fairywren, Malurus melanocephalus

Honeyeaters
Order: PasseriformesFamily: Meliphagidae

The honeyeaters are a large and diverse family of small to medium-sized birds most common in Australia and New Guinea. They are nectar feeders and closely resemble other nectar-feeding passerines.

Eastern spinebill, Acanthorhynchus tenuirostris
Pied honeyeater, Certhionyx variegatus
Lewin's honeyeater, Meliphaga lewinii 
White-fronted honeyeater, Purnella albifrons 
Yellow-faced honeyeater, Caligavis chrysops 
Yellow-tufted honeyeater, Lichenostomus melanops
Purple-gaped honeyeater, Lichenostomus cratitius (A)
Bell miner, Manorina melanophrys 
Noisy miner, Manorina melanocephala 
Yellow-throated miner, Manorina flavigula 
Black-eared miner, Manorina melanotis
Spiny-cheeked honeyeater, Acanthagenys rufogularis
Little wattlebird, Anthochaera chrysoptera  
Regent honeyeater, Anthochaera phrygia 
Red wattlebird, Anthochaera carunculata 
Mangrove honeyeater, Gavicalis fasciogularis 
Singing honeyeater, Gavicalis virescens 
Yellow-plumed honeyeater, Ptilotula ornata
White-plumed honeyeater, Ptilotula penicillata
Fuscous honeyeater, Ptilotula fusca 
Gray-fronted honeyeater, Ptilotula plumula 
Gibber chat, Ashbyia lovensis 
Crimson chat, Epthianura tricolor 
Orange chat, Epthianura aurifrons  
White-fronted chat, Epthianura albifrons
Black honeyeater, Sugomel niger
Dusky myzomela, Myzomela obscura (A)
Scarlet myzomela, Myzomela sanguinolenta
Tawny-crowned honeyeater, Gliciphila melanops
Banded honeyeater, Cissomela pectoralis (A)
Brown honeyeater, Lichmera indistincta
Crescent honeyeater, Phylidonyris pyrrhopterus
New Holland honeyeater, Phylidonyris novaehollandiae 
White-cheeked honeyeater, Phylidonyris niger 
White-eared honeyeater, Nesoptilotis leucotis 
Blue-faced honeyeater, Entomyzon cyanotis
White-throated honeyeater, Melithreptus albogularis
White-naped honeyeater, Melithreptus lunatus 
Brown-headed honeyeater, Melithreptus brevirostris 
Black-chinned honeyeater, Melithreptus gularis 
Striped honeyeater, Plectorhyncha lanceolata
Painted honeyeater, Grantiella picta 
Little friarbird, Philemon citreogularis
Noisy friarbird, Philemon corniculatus

Bristlebirds
Order: PasseriformesFamily: Dasyornithidae

Bristlebirds are long-tailed, sedentary, ground-frequenting birds. The common name of the family is derived from the presence of prominent rictal bristles - three stiff, hair-like feathers curving downwards on either side of the gape.

Eastern bristlebird, Dasyornis brachypterus

Pardalotes
Order: PasseriformesFamily: Pardalotidae

Pardalotes spend most of their time high in the outer foliage of trees, feeding on insects, spiders, and above all lerps (a type of sap-sucking insect).

Spotted pardalote, Pardalotus punctatus 
Red-browed pardalote, Pardalotus rubricatus 
Striated pardalote, Pardalotus striatus

Thornbills and allies
Order: PasseriformesFamily: Acanthizidae

Thornbills are small passerine birds, similar in habits to the tits.

Pilotbird, Pycnoptilus floccosus 
Rockwarbler, Origma solitaria (E)
Yellow-throated scrubwren, Sericornis citreogularis 
White-browed scrubwren, Sericornis frontalis 
Large-billed scrubwren, Sericornis magnirostra 
Redthroat, Pyrrholaemus brunneus 
Speckled warbler, Pyrrholaemus sagittatus 
Rufous fieldwren, Calamanthus campestris 
Striated fieldwren, Calamanthus fuliginosus 
Chestnut-rumped heathwren, Hylacola pyrrhopygia 
Shy heathwren, Hylacola cauta
Buff-rumped thornbill, Acanthiza reguloides 
Brown thornbill, Acanthiza pusilla 
Inland thornbill, Acanthiza apicalis 
Yellow-rumped thornbill, Acanthiza chrysorrhoa 
Chestnut-rumped thornbill, Acanthiza uropygialis 
Yellow thornbill, Acanthiza nana 
Striated thornbill, Acanthiza lineata 
Weebill, Smicrornis brevirostris 
White-throated gerygone, Gerygone olivacea
Brown gerygone, Gerygone mouki 
Western gerygone, Gerygone fusca 
Mangrove gerygone, Gerygone levigaster
Lord Howe gerygone, Gerygone insularis Outlying islands only Extinct
Southern whiteface, Aphelocephala leucopsis
Banded whiteface, Aphelocephala nigricincta (A)

Pseudo-babblers
Order: PasseriformesFamily: Pomatostomidae

The pseudo-babblers are small to medium-sized birds endemic to Australia and New Guinea. They are ground-feeding omnivores and highly social.

Gray-crowned babbler, Pomatostomus temporalis
White-browed babbler, Pomatostomus superciliosus 
Hall's babbler, Pomatostomus halli 
Chestnut-crowned babbler, Pomatostomus ruficeps

Logrunners
Order: PasseriformesFamily: Orthonychidae

The Orthonychidae is a family of birds with a single genus, Orthonyx, which comprises two types of passerine birds endemic to Australia and New Guinea, the logrunners and the chowchilla. Both use stiffened tails to brace themselves when feeding.

Australian logrunner, Orthonyx temminckii

Quail-thrushes and jewel-babblers
Order: PasseriformesFamily: Cinclosomatidae

The Cinclosomatidae is a family containing jewel-babblers and quail-thrushes.

Spotted quail-thrush, Cinclosoma punctatum 
Chestnut quail-thrush, Cinclosoma castanotum 
Chestnut-breasted quail-thrush, Cinclosoma castaneothorax 
Cinnamon quail-thrush, Cinclosoma cinnamomeum

Cuckooshrikes
Order: PasseriformesFamily: Campephagidae

The cuckooshrikes are small to medium-sized passerine birds. They are predominantly greyish with white and black, although some species are brightly coloured.

Ground cuckooshrike, Coracina maxima 
Barred cuckooshrike, Coracina lineata
Black-faced cuckooshrike, Coracina novaehollandiae
White-bellied cuckooshrike, Coracina papuensis
White-winged triller, Lalage tricolor
Varied triller, Lalage leucomela
Common cicadabird,  Edolisoma tenuirostre

Sittellas
Order: PasseriformesFamily: Neosittidae

The sittellas are a family of small passerine birds found only in Australasia. They resemble treecreepers, but have soft tails.

Varied sittella, Neositta chrysoptera

Whipbirds and wedgebills
Order: PasseriformesFamily: Psophodidae

The Psophodidae is a family containing whipbirds and wedgebills.

Eastern whipbird, Psophodes olivaceus
Chirruping wedgebill, Psophodes cristatus

Australo-Papuan bellbirds
Order: PasseriformesFamily: Oreoicidae

The three species contained in the family have been moved around between  different families for fifty years. A series of studies of the DNA of Australian birds between 2006 and 2001 found strong support for treating the three genera as a new family, which was formally named in 2016.

Crested bellbird, Oreoica gutturalis

Shrike-tits
Order: PasseriformesFamily: Falcunculidae

The shrike-tits have a parrot-like bill, used for distinctive bark-stripping behaviour, which gains it access to invertebrates

Eastern shrike-tit, Falcunculus frontatus

Whistlers and allies
Order: PasseriformesFamily: Pachycephalidae

The family Pachycephalidae includes the whistlers, shrikethrushes, and some of the pitohuis.

Gray shrikethrush, Colluricincla harmonica
Arafura shrikethrush, Colluricincla megarhyncha
Rufous shrikethrush, Colluricincla rufogaster
Olive whistler, Pachycephala olivacea
Red-lored whistler, Pachycephala rufogularis
Gilbert's whistler, Pachycephala inornata
Golden whistler, Pachycephala pectoralis
Rufous whistler, Pachycephala rufiventris

Old World orioles
Order: PasseriformesFamily: Oriolidae

The Old World orioles are colourful passerine birds. They are not related to the New World orioles.

Olive-backed oriole, Oriolus sagittatus
Australasian figbird, Sphecotheres vieilloti

Woodswallows, bellmagpies, and allies
Order: PasseriformesFamily: Artamidae

The woodswallows are soft-plumaged, somber-coloured passerine birds. They are smooth, agile flyers with moderately large, semi-triangular wings. The cracticids: currawongs, bellmagpies and butcherbirds, are similar to the other corvids. They have large, straight bills and mostly black, white or grey plumage. All are omnivorous to some degree.

White-breasted woodswallow, Artamus leucorynchus
Masked woodswallow, Artamus personatus 
White-browed woodswallow, Artamus superciliosus 
Black-faced woodswallow, Artamus cinereus
Dusky woodswallow, Artamus cyanopterus
Little woodswallow, Artamus minor 
Gray butcherbird, Cracticus torquatus 
Pied butcherbird, Cracticus nigrogularis
Australian magpie, Gymnorhina tibicen
Pied currawong, Strepera graculina
Gray currawong, Strepera versicolor

Fantails
Order: PasseriformesFamily: Rhipiduridae

The fantails are small insectivorous birds which are specialist aerial feeders.

Willie-wagtail, Rhipidura leucophrys
Rufous fantail, Rhipidura rufifrons
Gray fantail, Rhipidura albiscapa

Drongos
Order: PasseriformesFamily: Dicruridae

The drongos are mostly black or dark grey in colour, sometimes with metallic tints. They have long forked tails, and some Asian species have elaborate tail decorations. They have short legs and sit very upright when perched, like a shrike. They flycatch or take prey from the ground.

Spangled drongo, Dicrurus bracteatus

Birds-of-Paradise
Order: PasseriformesFamily: Paradisaeidae

The birds-of-paradise are best known for the striking plumage possessed by the males of most species, in particular highly elongated and elaborate feathers extending from the tail, wings or head. These plumes are used in courtship displays to attract females.

Paradise riflebird, Ptiloris paradiseus

Monarch flycatchers
Order: PasseriformesFamily: Monarchidae

The monarch flycatchers are small to medium-sized insectivorous passerines which hunt by flycatching.

White-eared monarch, Carterornis leucotis 
Black-faced monarch, Monarcha melanopsis
Spectacled monarch, Symposiachrus trivirgatus
Magpie-lark, Grallina cyanoleuca
Leaden flycatcher, Myiagra rubecula
Satin flycatcher, Myiagra cyanoleuca
Restless flycatcher, Myiagra inquieta 
Shining flycatcher, Myiagra alecto (A)

White-winged chough and apostlebird
Order: PasseriformesFamily: Corcoracidae

They are found in open habitat in eastern Australia, mostly open eucalypt woodlands and some forest that lacks a closed canopy. They are highly social, spend much of their time foraging through leaf litter with a very distinctive gait, calling to one another almost constantly

White-winged chough, Corcorax melanorhamphos 
Apostlebird, Struthidea cinerea

Crows, jays, and magpies
Order: PasseriformesFamily: Corvidae

The family Corvidae includes crows, ravens, jays, choughs, magpies, treepies, nutcrackers and ground jays. Corvids are above average in size among the Passeriformes, and some of the larger species show high levels of intelligence.

House crow, Corvus splendens (A)
Torresian crow, Corvus orru
Little crow, Corvus bennetti 
Australian raven, Corvus coronoides 
Little raven, Corvus mellori (A)
Forest raven, Corvus tasmanicus

Australasian robins
Order: PasseriformesFamily: Petroicidae

Most species of Petroicidae have a stocky build with a large rounded head, a short straight bill and rounded wingtips. They occupy a wide range of wooded habitats, from subalpine to tropical rainforest, and mangrove swamp to semi-arid scrubland. All are primarily insectivores, although a few supplement their diet with seeds.

Jacky-winter, Microeca fascinans
Scarlet robin, Petroica multicolor
Flame robin, Petroica phoenicea (A)
Rose robin, Petroica rosea 
Pink robin, Petroica rodinogaster 
Red-capped robin, Petroica goodenovii 
Hooded robin, Melanodryas cucullata 
White-faced robin, Tregellasia leucops
Pale-yellow robin, Tregellasia capito 
Eastern yellow robin, Eopsaltria australis 
Southern scrub-robin, Drymodes brunneopygia

Larks
Order: PasseriformesFamily: Alaudidae

Larks are small terrestrial birds with often extravagant songs and display flights. Most larks are fairly dull in appearance. Their food is insects and seeds.

Horsfield’s bushlark, Mirafra javanica
Eurasian skylark, Alauda arvensis (I)

Cisticolas and allies
Order: PasseriformesFamily: Cisticolidae

The Cisticolidae are warblers found mainly in warmer southern regions of the Old World. They are generally very small birds of drab brown or grey appearance found in open country such as grassland or scrub.

Golden-headed cisticola, Cisticola exilis

Reed warblers and allies
Order: PasseriformesFamily: Acrocephalidae

The members of this family are usually rather large for "warblers". Most are rather plain olivaceous brown above with much yellow to beige below. They are usually found in open woodland, reedbeds, or tall grass. The family occurs mostly in southern to western Eurasia and surroundings, but it also ranges far into the Pacific, with some species in Africa.

Oriental reed warbler, Acrocephalus orientalis (A)
Australian reed warbler, Acrocephalus australis

Grassbirds and allies
Order: PasseriformesFamily: Locustellidae

Locustellidae are a family of small insectivorous songbirds found mainly in Eurasia, Africa, and the Australian region. They are smallish birds with tails that are usually long and pointed, and tend to be drab brownish or buffy all over.

Spinifexbird, Poodytes carteri 
Little grassbird, Poodytes gramineus
Brown songlark, Cincloramphus cruralis
Rufous songlark, Cincloramphus mathewsi 
Tawny grassbird, Cincloramphus timoriensis

Swallows
Order: PasseriformesFamily: Hirundinidae

The family Hirundinidae is adapted to aerial feeding. They have a slender streamlined body, long pointed wings, and a short bill with a wide gape. The feet are adapted to perching rather than walking, and the front toes are partially joined at the base.

Barn swallow, Hirundo rustica (A) 
Welcome swallow, Hirundo neoxena
Fairy martin, Petrochelidon ariel 
Tree martin, Petrochelidon nigricans
White-backed swallow, Cheramoeca leucosterna

Bulbuls
Order: PasseriformesFamily: Pycnonotidae

Bulbuls are medium-sized songbirds. Some are colourful with yellow, red or orange vents, cheeks, throats or supercilia, but most are drab, with uniform olive-brown to black plumage. Some species have distinct crests.

Red-whiskered bulbul, Pycnonotus jocosus (I)

Leaf warblers
Order: PasseriformesFamily: Phylloscopidae

Leaf warblers are a family of small insectivorous birds found mostly in Eurasia and ranging into Wallacea and Africa. The species are of various sizes, often green-plumaged above and yellow below, or more subdued with grayish-green to grayish-brown colors.

Arctic warbler, Phylloscopus borealis (A) 
Kamchatka leaf warbler, Phylloscopus examinandus (A)

White-eyes, yuhinas, and allies
Order: PasseriformesFamily: Zosteropidae

The white-eyes are small birds of rather drab appearance, the plumage above being typically greenish-olive, but some species have a white or bright yellow throat, breast, or lower parts, and several have buff flanks. As the name suggests, many species have a white ring around each eye.

Australian yellow white-eye, Zosterops luteus 
Silver-eye, Zosterops lateralis
Robust white-eye, Zosterops strenuus Outlying islands only Extinct

Starlings
Order: PasseriformesFamily: Sturnidae

Starlings are small to medium-sized passerine birds. Their flight is strong and direct and they are very gregarious. Their preferred habitat is fairly open country. They eat insects and fruit. Plumage is typically dark with a metallic sheen.

Norfolk starling, Aplonis fusca Outlying islands only Extinct
European starling, Sturnus vulgaris (I)
Rosy starling, Pastor roseus (A) 
Common myna, Acridotheres tristis (I)

Thrushes and allies
Order: PasseriformesFamily: Turdidae

The thrushes are a group of passerine birds that occur mainly in the Old World. They are plump, soft plumaged, small to medium-sized insectivores or sometimes omnivores, often feeding on the ground. Many have attractive songs.

Bassian thrush, Zoothera lunulata
Russet-tailed thrush, Zoothera heinei 
Song thrush, Turdus philomelos
Eurasian blackbird, Turdus merula (I)

Flowerpeckers
Order: PasseriformesFamily: Dicaeidae

The flowerpeckers are very small, stout, often brightly coloured birds, with short tails, short thick curved bills, and tubular tongues.

Mistletoebird, Dicaeum hirundinaceum

Sunbirds and spiderhunters
Order: PasseriformesFamily: Nectariniidae

The sunbirds and spiderhunters are very small passerine birds which feed largely on nectar, although they will also take insects, especially when feeding young. Their flight is fast and direct on short wings. Most species can take nectar by hovering like a hummingbird, but usually perch to feed.

Olive-backed sunbird, Cinnyris jugularis (A)

Waxbills and allies
Order: PasseriformesFamily: Estrildidae

The estrildid finches are small passerine birds of the Old World tropics and Australasia. They are gregarious and often colonial seed eaters with short thick but pointed bills. They are all similar in structure and habits, but have wide variation in plumage colours and patterns.

Diamond firetail, Stagonopleura guttata 
Beautiful firetail, Stagonopleura bella
Red-browed firetail, Neochmia temporalis
Painted firetail, Emblema pictum (A)
Star finch, Bathilda ruficauda (A)
Plum-headed finch, Aidemosyne modesta 
Double-barred finch, Stizoptera bichenovii
Zebra finch, Taeniopygia guttata
Black-throated finch, Poephila cincta (A)
Scaly-breasted munia, Lonchura punctulata (I)
Chestnut-breasted munia, Lonchura castaneothorax
'

Old World sparrows
Order: PasseriformesFamily: Passeridae

Old World sparrows are small passerine birds, typically small, plump, brown or grey with short tails and short powerful beaks. They are seed-eaters, but also consume small insects.

House sparrow, Passer domesticus (I)
Eurasian tree sparrow, Passer montanus (I)

Wagtails and pipits
Order: PasseriformesFamily: Motacillidae

Motacillidae is a family of small passerine birds with medium to long tails and comprises the wagtails, longclaws, and pipits. These are slender ground-feeding insectivores of open country.

Gray wagtail, Motacilla cinerea (A)
Eastern yellow wagtail, Motacilla tschutschensis (A)
Citrine wagtail, Motacilla citreola (A)
White wagtail, Motacilla alba (A)
Australian pipit, Anthus australis

Finches, euphonias, and allies
Order: PasseriformesFamily: Fringillidae

Finches are small to moderately large seed-eating passerine birds with a strong beak, usually conical and in some species very large. All have 12 tail feathers and nine primary flight feathers. Finches have a bouncing flight, alternating bouts of flapping with gliding on closed wings, and most sing well.

European greenfinch, Chloris chloris (I)
Common redpoll, Acanthis flammea (I)
Lesser redpoll, Acanthis cabaret (I)
European goldfinch, Carduelis carduelis (I)

See also
List of birds
Lists of birds by region
List of birds of Australia

References

New South Wales
Birds